The Nworie River is a river in Nigeria that passes through Owerri and drains into the Otamiri River at Nekede. The length of the river from its source to its confluence is 9.2 km. The river is heavily polluted; in 2017 the local government issues warnings against using water from the river.

Environmental impacts

References 

Rivers of Nigeria